The Yuan dynasty was a Mongol-ruled Chinese dynasty which existed from 1271 to 1368. After the conquest of the Western Xia, Western Liao, and Jin dynasties they allowed for the continuation of locally minted copper currency, as well as allowing for the continued use of previously created and older forms of currency (from previous Chinese dynasties), while they immediately abolished the Jin dynasty's paper money as it suffered heavily from inflation due to the wars with the Mongols. After the conquest of the Song dynasty was completed, the Yuan dynasty started issuing their own copper coins largely based on older Jin dynasty models, though eventually the preferred Yuan currency became the Jiaochao and silver sycees, as  coins would eventually fall largely into disuse. Although the Mongols at first preferred to have every banknote backed up by gold and silver, high government expenditures forced the Yuan to create fiat money in order to sustain government spending.

Inscriptions on the obverses of the coins appeared both in Traditional Chinese characters and 'Phags-pa script, and coins appeared in denominations of 2, 3, 5, and even 10 wén, the larger denominations led to a debasement of the currency which caused inflation.

Background 

After the Mongol Empire began their campaigns against the Western Liao, Western Xia, and Jin dynasties, they started to cast their own copper cash coins with the inscription "Da Chao Tong Bao". It is currently unknown if these coins were already cast under Genghis Khan or if production started under Kublai Khan during the Yuan dynasty as these coins are undocumented and rare. Production of Yuan dynasty copper coins with the "Zhong Tong Yuan Bao" (中統元寶) coins commissioned by Kublai Khan started concurrently with the issuance of paper money which was backed up by silver sycees.

Prior to the establishment of the Yuan dynasty, Möngke Khan created the Department of Monetary Affairs in 1253 to oversee the issuing and creation of paper money, this was to ensure that the nobility would not cause more inflation by overprinting money. The Yuan dynasty would see the introduction of the bimetallic standard, copper would be used for short distance, and silver for long distance transactions.

History

Kublai Khan, Temür Khan, and Külüg Khan  

Kublai Khan asked his advisor Liu Bingzhong about the usage of coinage and with a Yin and Yang metaphor Bingzhong claimed that no peace could exist within the Yuan empire if coins continued to be used and advised for the exclusive circulation of mulberry bark paper money. 

 

The "Zhongtong Yuanbao" coins were only cast for 3 years (1260 to 1263), later coins would again be issued under Kublai Khan. In the year 1285 Liu Shirong advocated for the creation of the Zhiyuan Tongbao (至元通寶) cash coins, stating that the Mongols should follow the examples of the Han and Tang dynasties in the production of copper-alloy cash coins, and that these cash coins should circulate concurrent with silk and paper money. 

For the entire duration of Temür Khan coins were only symbolically cast for religious institutions. 

Under Külüg Khan the Yuan dynasty’s treasury was almost completely depleted which eventually led to Külüg Khan issuing a new banknote called the "Zhi Da Yin Jiaochao" which coincided with the minting of "Zhida Tongbao" (至大通寶) coins, which are the most commonly cast Yuan era coins. Under Külüg Khan the levels of inflation rose to 80% as the government kept printing more banknotes due, and in order to ensure the government’s control on the currency Külüg Khan banned the usage of silver and gold coins, and stopped the circulation of silver certificates in favour of fiat banknotes.

Ayurbarwada Buyantu Khan and the cessation of production  
 

Ayurbarwada Buyantu Khan completely ceased the production of coinage in favour of paper money and made it illegal to use coins for payment, however the private production of copper cash coins would persist despite these laws. Because the khans of the Yuan dynasty were Buddhists they allowed Buddhist temples exemption from taxation and granted them special rights to cast bronze statues, and mint their own coins for religious offerings. During the periods that paper money was considered to be less valuable due to inflation people would use these "temple coins" as substitute currency.

Toghon Temür  

For 40 years the production of coins would not continue until the reign of Toghon Temür who started casting coins again in 1350 alongside his new series of banknotes. 

There are three basic typed of the Zhizheng Tongbao (至正通寶) cash coins. The first type has the Earthly Branch, indicating the year of casting, written in 'Phags-pa script located above the square centre hole situated on the reverse side of the cash coin. The Zhizheng Tongbao cash coins with the reverse inscription "寅" (meaning 1350 in the Chinese calendar) are the rarest because they began to be cast in November 1350 meaning that their production period was relatively short. This type was cast in values of 1 wén, 2 wén, and 3 wén. 

The 'Phags-pa words on these Zhizheng Tongbao cash coins represent the following years: 

 

In some variants reverse side of the cash coin displays the Mongol word for the Chinese cyclical calendar characters "Geng Yin" (庚寅, gēng yín) which indicates that these cash coins were cast somewhere in the year 1350. These cash coin typically have a diameter of 33 millimeters and tend to have a weight of about 8.8 grams.

The second type of Zhizheng Tongbao cash coins have the Earthly Branch of their year of production above the square centre hole on the reverse side, and the nominal value of the coin below the square centre hole. For example, the words "戌十" (xū shí) would denote that the cash coin was produced in the year 1358 and a nominal value of 10 wén. The denominations of this type were cast as 2 wén, 3 wén, 5 wén, and 10 wén.

The third type of Zhizheng Tongbao cash coins have the Earthly Branch representing the year of production above the square centre hole on the reverse side, and the nominal weight of the coin below the square centre hole. For example, the 'Phags-pa transliteration of the word "亥" (hài) written above the square centre hole to denote that the cash coin was produced in the year 1359 and the words "壹兩重" (yī liǎng chóng) inscribed below the square centre hole which translates as "1 tael in weight". 
 
In 1350 chancellor Toqto'a attempted to reform the Yuan dynasty currency by printing out more paper money and creating large "Zhizheng Zhibao" (至正之寶) copper coins which were inscribed with the promise that these coins were backed in paper money (權鈔, quán chāo, which translates as "equivalent to paper money"), and that these would be in equal value. The calligraphy of the inscription for the Zhizheng Zhibao cash coins was done by the court poet Zhou Boqi. 

The reverse side of the Zhizheng Zhibao cash coins have to the left of the square centre hole the traditional Chinese characters indicating the nominal value of the coin, for example, the equivalent of wǔ qián (伍錢, "5 qián") in paper money. 

 

As the paper money was made out of inferior material it would often be easily damaged making it hard for the people to redeem, this led to rebellions in the southern regions which in turn caused the Yuan government to quickly print more money in order to finance its military expenditures, leading to a decreasing confidence in paper money causing hyperinflation. Eventually entire carts filled with banknotes were needed for simple transactions leading to the people disregarding paper money as currency and eventually barter had become the norm as coinage had already become a rarity.

After the rise of the Ming dynasty the Northern Yuan dynasty didn't continue to produce cash coins. The usage of paper currency under the Yuan further inspired other countries such as Korea, Japan, and various states of India to develop their own paper currencies.

List of coins issued

Coins issued by the Mongols before the establishment of the Yuan dynasty include the "Da Chao Tong Bao", "Da Guan Tong Bao", "Tai He Tong Bao", and "Da Ding Tong Bao", these coins were all issued in the conquered lands of the former Jin dynasty and are subsequently known as frontier or border area coins. After the Song dynasty fell to the Mongols new coins started being issued.

'Phags-pa script was the official script of Yuan dynasty. Mongolian language on all coins were written in the 'Phags-pa script instead of traditional Mongolian script.

List of coins issued by the Mongols during Yuan dynasty:

Rebel coinages 

During the Red Turban rebellion organised by the White Lotus society; many of its leaders proclaimed their own kingdoms and empires that ruled over different regions of China, the most successful of these was Zhu Yuanzhang’s Ming dynasty which would unify China. Though the majority of these countries were short-lived some did produce their own coinage.

See also 

 Pūl (coin)
 Soum
 History of Chinese currency
 Zhou dynasty coinage
 Liao dynasty coinage
 Southern Song dynasty coinage
 Western Xia coinage
 Jin dynasty coinage (1115-1234)
 Ming dynasty coinage
 Qing dynasty coinage

Notes

References

Sources 

 
 Shinpan kaisei, Kosen nedantsuke, Narabi ni bantsuki (Improved New Edition: Price List of Old Coins, Together with Rarity Ranking), printed in the city of Nagoya, Tokugawa Shogunate (Japan) in 1799.
 
  (in English and Mongolian).

Coins of China
Cash coins 
coinage
Currencies of China
Medieval currencies
Chinese numismatics